Charles "Charlie" Annable (first ¼ 1905 – fourth ¼ 1957) was an English professional rugby league footballer who played in the 1920s and 1930s.

Background
Charlie Annable's birth was registered in Alverthorpe, or Hemsworth, West Riding of Yorkshire, and his death aged 52 was registered in Wakefield district, West Riding of Yorkshire, England.

Playing career

County honours
Charlie Annable won two caps for Yorkshire while at the Featherstone Rovers; during the 1928–29 season against Glamorgan and Monmouthshire, and during the 1929–30 season against Australia.

County League appearances
Charlie Annable played in Castleford's victory in the Yorkshire County League during the 1932–33 season.

County Cup Final appearances
Charles Annable played  in the Featherstone Rovers' 0-5 defeat by Leeds in the 1928 Yorkshire County Cup Final during the 1928–29 season at Belle Vue, Wakefield on Saturday 24 November 1928.

Club career
Charles Annable made his début for the Featherstone Rovers on Saturday 27 September 1924, he broke his clavicle in November 1927 which kept him out of Featherstone Rovers' run to the Championship Final during the 1927–28 season, in 1931 he was sold to Castleford for £400 (based on increases in average earnings, this would be approximately £66,750 in 2013), he appears to have scored no drop-goals (or field-goals as they are currently known in Australasia), but prior to the 1974–75 season all goals, whether; conversions, penalties, or drop-goals, scored 2-points, consequently prior to this date drop-goals were often not explicitly documented, therefore '0' drop-goals may indicate drop-goals not recorded, rather than no drop-goals scored. In addition, prior to the 1949–50 season, the archaic field-goal was also still a valid means of scoring points.

Contemporaneous article extract
"C. Annable' Featherstone Rovers (Northern Rugby League.) C. Annable has demonstrated to his club the value of local talent. He was born in Alverthorpe  in Yorkshire, and as a youth he has time for development. He is an unorthodox worker of the scrum, for he is not merely content to get the ball but he kicks to touch to advantage, and at other times bursts round to receive a reverse pass. Though on the small side everything points to his receiving county honours."

Genealogical information
Charlie Annable's marriage to Clara (née Rhodes) was registered during first ¼ 1928 in Wakefield district. They had children; Sheila Annable (birth registered second ¼ 1936 in Wakefield district).

References

External links
Search for "Annable" at rugbyleagueproject.org
 
Annable Memory Box Search at archive.castigersheritage.com

1905 births
1957 deaths
Castleford Tigers players
English rugby league players
Featherstone Rovers players
People from Alverthorpe
People from Hemsworth
Place of death missing
Rugby league halfbacks
Rugby league players from Wakefield
Yorkshire rugby league team players